The following are statistics about Primera División de México for the 1992-93 season.

Overview
It was contested by 20 teams, and Atlante won the championship.

Pachuca, who was promoted from Segunda División the previous season, was relegated.

Teams

Group stage

Group 1

Group 2

Group 3

Group 4

Results

Playoff

Repechaje round
Veracruz 1-1 ; 0-1 Tecos
UANL 3-0 ; 1-4 UNAM

Final

Atlante won 4–0 on aggregate.

Relegation table

References
Mexico - List of final tables (RSSSF)

Liga MX seasons
1992–93 in Mexican football
Mex